Zoelen is a village in the Dutch province of Gelderland. It is a part of the municipality of Buren, and lies about 3 km north of Tiel. Castle Zoelen is located near the village.

Zoelen was a separate municipality until 1978, when it was merged with Buren.

History 
It was first mentioned in 1139 as Sovlen, and means "settlement along the river Zoel". The village developed as a stretched out settlement along the former river. The Stefanus Church is from 1545, however the tower and church contain 15th century elements. In 1840, it was home to 918 people.

Castle Soelen 
 dates from the 13th century. In 1355, it is destroyed by the Duke Edward of Gelre. In 1362, Arnold van Soelen submits to the Duke, and rebuilds the castle. In 1574, the castle is burnt to ground to prevent it falling into Spanish hands. In 1643, it was rebuilt. In 1992, the castle and the  park became property of the State who transferred it to Staatsbosbeheer. The castle has been rebuilt as an apartment building.

Gallery

References

External links

Populated places in Gelderland
Former municipalities of Gelderland
Buren